Outstanding Drama Series is a category for the following awards:

American
Emmy Award: Primetime Emmy Award for Outstanding Drama Series
Golden Globe Award: Golden Globe Award for Best Television Series – Drama
Producers Guild of America Award: Norman Felton Award for Outstanding Producer of Episodic Television, Drama
NAACP Image Award: NAACP Image Award for Outstanding Drama Series
TCA Award: TCA Award for Outstanding Achievement in Drama
Satellite Award: Satellite Award for Best Television Series – Drama
Daytime Emmy Award: Daytime Emmy Award for Outstanding Drama Series
Critics' Choice Television Award: Critics' Choice Television Award for Best Drama Series
Favorite Network TV Drama
GLAAD Media Award for Outstanding Drama Series

Canadian
Canadian Screen Awards: Best Dramatic Series
Gemini Award: Gemini Award for Best Dramatic Series

European
British Academy Television Award: British Academy Television Award for Best Drama Series
National Television Awards: Best Drama Series

Australian
Logie Award: Logie Award for Most Outstanding Drama Series
Logie Award: Logie Award for Most Popular Australian Drama
Penguin Award